Teatro Nuovo can refer to the American opera company Teatro Nuovo (New York)
or to any of the following theatres in Italy:

Teatro Nuovo (Naples), an opera house and theatre in Naples
Teatro Lirico Giuseppe Verdi, an opera house in Trieste, originally named Teatro Nuovo
Teatro Donizetti, an opera house in Bergamo, originally named Teatro Nuovo
Teatro Rossini (Pesaro), an opera house in Pesaro, originally named Teatro Nuovo
, Ferrara
, Florence
, Florence (via Bufalini)
Teatro Nuovo (Milan), Milan
Teatro Nuovo (Mirandola), Mirandola
, Palermo
Teatro Nuovo (Serravalle), Serravalle-San Marino 
, Spoleto
, Udine
, Verona